Leyly Matine-Daftary (1937–2007) was an Iranian modernist artist and art educator. She was based in both Tehran and Paris. Matine-Daftary was best known for her flat paintings that highlighted simplicity but still expressed emotions.

Biography 
Leyly Matine-Daftary was born in 1937 in Tehran, Imperial State of Iran (now known as Iran). Her father, Ahmad Matin-Daftari, was Prime Minister of Iran, as was one of her grandfathers, Mohammad Mossadegh. After completing her elementary education in Tehran, she attended Cheltenham Ladies' College. She obtained a Fine Arts degree from the Slade School of Fine Art before returning to Tehran in the late 1950s.

From 1960 until 1956 she lectured on sculpture and sculpting at the Fine Arts Faculty of Tehran University. Matine-Daftary was involved in the early Tehran Biennial and in the Shiraz Arts Festival, for which she created iconic identifying materials.

Matine-Daftary died in Paris on 17 April 2007.

Exhibitions 

 2016, "20th Century Art/Middle East", part of Middle East Art Week, Dubai International Financial Centre (DIFC), Dubai
 2013 – 2014, "Iran Modern", Asia Society, New York City
 1974 – 1975, "Exhibition of the Contemporary Iranian Art collection of Farah Pahlavi" - (traveling) Tehran, Islamabad, Delhi, Istanbul, Ankara, Belgrade, Moscow, London and Paris
 1973, Salon d’Automne, Paris Palais des Beaux Arts, Brussels, Belgium
 1968, "International Festival of Arts", Shiraz Modern Iranian Art and Columbia University, New York City, New York
 1967, ”25 Years of Modern Iranian Art”, Tehran Museum, Tehran, Iran
 1966, Tehran Biennale, Iranian Pavilion, Official Selection, Tehran, Iran
 1962, Tehran Biennale, Iranian Pavilion, Official Selection, Tehran, Iran

See also
 List of Iranian artists
 List of Iranian painters
 List of Iranian women artists

References

External links 
 examples of Leyly Matine-Daftary's work on ArtNet.com

1937 births
2007 deaths
20th-century Iranian painters
20th-century Iranian women artists
21st-century Iranian women artists
21st-century Iranian painters
Alumni of the Slade School of Fine Art
Iranian women painters
Modern artists
Artists from Tehran
People educated at Cheltenham Ladies' College